Patrick Payton is an American football defensive end for the Florida State Seminoles.

High school career
Payton attended Miami Northwestern Senior High School in Miami, Florida. As a junior, he had 17.5 sacks. He committed to Florida State University to play college football.

College career
After redshirting his first year at Florida State in 2021, Payton earned playing time in 2022. He played in 13 games, finishing with 31 tackles and five sacks and was named the ACC Defensive Rookie of the Year.

References

External links
Florida State Seminoles bio

Living people
Players of American football from Miami
American football defensive ends
Florida State Seminoles football players